Forficula auricularia, the common earwig or European earwig, is an omnivorous insect in the family Forficulidae. The European earwig survives in a variety of environments and is a common household insect in North America. The name earwig comes from the appearance of the hindwings, which are unique and distinctive among insects, and resemble a human ear when unfolded; the species name of the common earwig, auricularia, is a specific reference to this feature. They are considered a household pest because of their tendency to invade crevices in homes and consume pantry foods, and may act either as a pest or as a beneficial species depending on the circumstances (see below).

Forficula auricularia is reddish-brown in color, with a flattened and elongate body, and slender, beaded antennae. An obvious feature of earwigs is the pair of 'pincers' or forceps at the tip of the flexible abdomen. Both sexes have these pincers; in males they are large and very curved, whereas in females they are straight. Nymphs are similar to adults in appearance, but their wings are either absent or small

Morphology
Forficula auricularia has an elongated flattened brownish-colored body, with a shield-shaped pronotum, two pairs of wings and a pair of forcep-like cerci. They are about 12–15 mm long. The second tarsal segment is lobed, extending distally below the third tarsal segment. The antenna consists of 11–14 segments, and the mouth parts are of the chewing type.

Adult males are polymorphic in body weight and head width, as well as cercus length and width. The male forceps are very robust and broadened basally with crenulate teeth. The female forceps are about 3 mm long, and are less robust and straighter. The cerci are used during mating, feeding, and self-defense. Females also have tegmina of about 2 mm in length. Third instar or older nymphs that have lost one branch of cerci are capable of regenerating it in form of a straight structure. Males with asymmetrical forceps are called gynandromorphs or hermaphrodites because they resemble females.

Distribution
Native to Europe, western Asia and probably North Africa, Forficula auricularia was introduced to North America in the early twentieth century and is currently spread throughout much of the continent. In North America, European earwigs comprise two sibling species, which are reproductively isolated. Populations in cold continental climates mostly have one clutch per year, forming species A, whereas those in warmer climates have two clutches per year, forming species B. European earwigs are most commonly found in temperate climates, since they were originally discovered in the Palearctic region, and are most active when the daily temperature has minimal fluctuation.

Behavior
European earwigs spend the daytime in cool, dark, inaccessible places such as flowers, fruits, and wood crevices. Active primarily at night, they seek out food ranging from plant matter to small insects. Though they are omnivorous, they are considered as scavengers rather than predators. Often they consume plant matter, though they have also been known to feed on aphids, spiders, insect eggs, and dead plants and insects, among other things. Their favorite plants include the common crucifer Sisymbrium officinale, the white clover Trifolium repens, and the dahlia Dahlia variabilis. They also like to feed on molasses, as well as on nonvascular plants, lichens and algae. They prefer meat or sugar to natural plant material even though plants are a major natural food source. European earwigs prefer aphids to plant material such as leaves and fruit slices of apple, cherry and pear. Adults eat more insects than do nymphs.

Although F. auricularia have well-developed wings, they are fairly weak and are rarely, if ever, used. Instead, as their main form of transportation, earwigs are carried from one place to another on clothing or commercial products like lumber, ornamental shrubs and even newspaper bundles.

Reproduction

A male finds prospective mates by olfaction. He then slips his cerci under the tip of the female's abdomen so that his and her ventral abdominal surfaces are in contact with each other, while both face in opposite directions. If not disturbed, pairs can stay in this mating position for many hours. Matings occurred frequently among clustered individuals particularly in locations that allow both partners to cling to a surface. Under laboratory conditions, the mating season peaked during August and September, and a single mating event enabled females to lay fertilized eggs.

European earwig nymphs look very similar to their adult counterparts except that they are a lighter color. The young go through four nymphal stages and do not leave the nest until after the first moult.

European earwigs overwinter about 5 mm below the surface of the ground. The female earwig lays a clutch of about 50 eggs in an underground nest in the autumn. She enters a dormant state and stays in the nest with the eggs. The female cares for her young by shifting the eggs about and cleaning them to avoid fungal growth. In the spring, she spreads them out into a single layer and the young emerge from the eggs. She guards them until they reach maturity after about one month. It is possible for the female to lay a second brood in one season and by the end of August all of the young reach maturity.

Habitat

Their daily abundance in a given year has been linked to factors such as temperature, wind velocity and the prevalence of easterly winds. The development of European earwigs also depends on temperature. Thus, the occurrence of European earwigs can be predicted based on weather parameters. Hibernating adults can tolerate cool temperatures, but their survival is reduced in poorly drained soils such as clay. To avoid excessive moisture, they seek the southern side of well-drained slopes. Sometimes they also occupy the hollow stems of flowers where the soil is poorly drained. Their eggs are capable of resisting damage from cold and heat.

Agricultural impact
Forficula auricularia has been known to cause significant damage to crops, flowers, and fruit orchards when at high population levels. Some of the commercially valuable vegetables it feeds upon include cabbage, cauliflower, chard, celery, lettuce, potato, beet, and cucumber among others. Earwigs readily consume corn (maize) silk and can damage the crop. Among fruits, they have been found to damage apple and pear orchards. They damage young plum and peach trees in early spring, when other food is scarce, by devouring blossoms and leaves at night. It is not uncommon to find them wedged among petals of fresh cut carnations, roses, dahlia and zinnia.

In addition to all of the agricultural problems caused, humans are not very fond of F. auricularia because of its foul odor and annoying propensity to aggregate together in or near human dwellings.

Control of F. auricularia has been attempted using some of its natural enemies, including the parasitoid fly Bigonicheta spinipenni, the fungi Erynia forficulae and Metarhizium anisopliae, as well as many species of birds. The tachinid flies Triarthria setipennis (Fallen) and Ocytata pallipes have been introduced in North America to control F. auricularia in the 1920s.

Insecticides have also been successfully implemented, although commercial products are rarely targeted specifically towards earwigs. Multipurpose insecticides for control of earwigs, grasshoppers, sowbugs and other insects are more common. Diazinon, an organophosphate insecticide, has been known to continue killing F. auricularia up to 17 days after initial spraying.

Humans have, however, found beneficial uses of F. auricularia in the pest management of other insects. The European earwig is a natural predator of a number of other agricultural pests, including the pear psyllid and several aphid species, and in this regard has been used to control outbreaks of such organisms. Damage to crops by F. auricularia is limited as long as there are high population levels of their insect prey.

See also
 List of Dermapterans of Australia
 List of Dermapterans of Sri Lanka

References

Further reading
 
 Eisner, T. (1960). Defense Mechanisms of Arthropods. II. The Chemical and Mechanical Weapons of an Earwig. Psyche 67:62–70 PDF (13 Creative Commons Attribution 2.5 license)

External links

 ARKive: Images of Life on Earth - Forficula auricularia fact page as well as photos and video
 Encyclopedia of Life - Forficula auricularia images and facts
 Royal Horticultural Society- Gardening advice: Earwigs - Gardening advice in relation to Forficula auricularia

Forficulidae
Household pest insects
Insects described in 1758
Insects of Europe
Taxa named by Carl Linnaeus
da:Ørentvist